Jordanita algirica is a moth of the family Zygaenidae. It is found in Morocco, Algeria and Tunisia. There are also some unconfirmed records from Sicily.

The length of the forewings is 8.1–13 mm for males and 7.1–12 mm for females. Adults are on wing from April onwards on low altitudes and up to July in mountainous areas. They feed on the flower nectar of various Asteraceae species.

In Morocco, J. algirica is a very variable species. Hence a number of subspecies have been described. Larger individuals are found in the northern regions of the Middle Atlas, while the smallest are found in the Anti-Atlas and Tunisia. The variety is so big, that further study is needed to determine if these subspecies are valid.

The larvae feed on Carthamus calvus.

References

C. M. Naumann, W. G. Tremewan: The Western Palaearctic Zygaenidae. Apollo Books, Stenstrup 1999,

External links
The Barcode of Life Data Systems (BOLD)

Procridinae
Moths described in 1917